Phujel is a town in Gorkha District in the Gandaki Zone of northern-central Nepal. At the time of the 1991 Nepal census it had a population of 4,563 and had 841 houses in the town.

References

Populated places in Gorkha District